Stephen Barrett Tanner is an American author  currently residing in Sierra Madre, California.  He served with US special forces in Italy in World War II and following his graduation from Yale University in the US Department of State (1949–1969).

As a military historian and freelance writer, Tanner has produced the following books:

 Afghanistan - A Military History from Alexander the Great to the War Against the Taliban  (2002) According to WorldCat, the book is held in 1970 libraries  Reviewed in Times Literary Supplement 
Translated into Russian as Афганистан : история войн от Александра Македонского до падения "Талибана"
Epic Retreats: From 1776 to the Evacuation of Saigon; 
Refuge from the Reich: American Airmen and Switzerland during World War II  (2000)  According to WorldCat,  held in 689 libraries.  Reviewed in Journal of Military History.
The wars of the Bushes : a father and son as military leaders.(2004)  According to WorldCat,  held in 450 libraries. 
Translated into Polish as Wojny Bushów : ojciec i syn jako zwierzchnicy sił zbrojnych 
Translated into Chinese as 父子统帅：布什们的战争/父子統帥：布什們的戰爭, fù zǐ tǒng shuài: bù shí mén dí zhàn zhēng
Translated into Turkish as Bush'ların savaşları : askeri liderler olarak bir baba ve oğlun portresi 
 (with Samuel A Southworth)  U.S. special forces : a guide to America's special operations units : the world's most elite fighting force (2002)  Held in 308 libraries. 

Tanner is the son of Dr William Tanner and is married to Anne (Nancy) daughter of art historian Professor Emerson Howland Swift.  Tanner has two children.

References
 Tanner, Stephen. Afghanistan- A Military History from Alexander the Great to the War Against the Taliban 1st Ed,Cambridge:De Capo Press, 2002.

External links

American military writers
Yale University alumni
21st-century American historians
21st-century American male writers
Year of birth missing (living people)
Living people
People from Sierra Madre, California
Historians from California
American male non-fiction writers